FKK may refer to:
 Freikörperkultur (FKK), a German naturist social movement and health culture
 FKK sauna clubs, a type of German prostitution club that erroneously or falsely refers itself to the German FKK 'Freikörperkultur' naturist culture
 Falkirk High railway station, in Scotland
 Kirya-Konzəl language, spoken in Nigeria
 FK Krasnodar, a Russian football club